is Japanese dumpling made from the meal or flour of the kibi (proso millet) grain. The treat was used by folktale-hero Momotarō (the Peach Boy) to recruit his three beastly retainers, in the commonly known version of the tale.

In modern times, this millet dumpling has been confused with the identically-sounding confection Kibi dango named after Kibi Province (now Okayama Prefecture), even though the latter hardly uses any millet at all. The confectioners continue to market their product by association with the hero Momotarō, and more widely, Okayama residents have engaged in a concerted effort to claim the hero as native to their province. In this context, the millet dumpling's historical association with the Kibi Province has undergone close scrutiny. In particular, Kibitsu Shrine of the region has had ongoing association with serving food by the name kibi dango.

Conventionally, kibi dango or kibi mochi uses the sticky variety proso millet known as mochi kibi, rather than the regular (amylose-rich) millet used for creating sweets.

History

The Japanese-Portuguese dictionary Nippo Jisho (1603–04) also listed "qibidango", which it defined as "millet dumpling".

There had been similar foods in earlier times, though not specifically called kibi dango. Writer  in his 1862 essay collection observed that such foods, made out of millet meals or other ground grains undergoing a process of steaming and pounding, and recognizable as dango to his contemporaries, were once called bei (the same character as mochi) in the olden days.

Kibitsu Shrine
The Kibitsu Shrine of the former Kibi Province has an early connection to the millet dumpling, due to the easy pun on the geographic name "Kibi" sounding the same as kibi 'millet'. The pun is attested in one waka poem and one haiku dating to the early 17th century, brought to attention by poet and scholar  in a treatise written in 1941.

The first example, a satirical  composed at the shrine by the feudal lord Hosokawa Yūsai (d. 1610) reads "Since priestess/pestle (kine) is traditional to the gods, I would fain see straightaway pounded into dumplings (the millet of) the Millet Shrine/Kibitsu Shrine (where I am at)." The  is a tool used in conjunction with a wooden mortar (usu), and it is implicit in the poem that the process required these tools to pound the grain into kibi-dango dumplings.. And it must have been something the shrine served to visitors on some occasions, one source venturing as far as to say that "it was already being sold at Kibitsu Shrine at the time.

A haiku in similar vein, of somewhat later date and also at the same shrine according to Shida, was composed by an obscure poet named  of Bitchū Province. The haiku reads "Oh, mochi-like snow, Japan's number one Kibi dango", The occurrence here of the line "Japan's number one kibi dango" which recurs as a stock phrase in the Momotarō story constituted "immovable" proof of an early Momotarō connection in Shida's estimation, but it was based on the underlying conviction that this phrase was ever-present since the earliest inception of the Momotarō legend.

In later years, more elaborate legends were promoted connecting the shrine, or rather its resident deity Kibitsuhiko-no-mikoto to the kibi dango. The founder of the Kōeido confection business authored a travel guide in 1895, in which he claimed that Kibitsuhiko rolled with his own hand some kibi dango to give to Emperor Jimmu who stopped at Takayama Palace in Okayama, but that anecdote was purely anachronistic. Later, an amateur historian wrote a 1930 book proposing that the legend of Kibitsuhiko's ogre-slaying was the source of the "Peach Boy" or Momotarō folktale, leading to fervent local efforts to localize the hero Momotarō to Kibi Province (Okayama Prefecture).

Momotarō legend
In the widely familiar version of Momotarō, the hero spares his traveling rations of "kibi dango" to a dog, a pheasant, and a monkey and thereby gains their allegiance. However the scholar Koike compared the various kusazōshi texts and discovered that early written texts of the Momotarō legend failed to call the rations "kibi dango". Versions from the Genroku era (1688–1704) has , and other tales antedating "kibi dango" have  or   instead. Moreover, the "Japan's number one" brag was unattached to Momotarō's kibi dango until around the Genbun era (1736) as far as Koike could fathom.

Footnotes

Explanatory notes

Citations

References

 

Dumplings
Wagashi
Millets